2012–13 World Series Hockey was supposed to become the second season of the hockey tournament World Series Hockey, a professional league for field hockey in India. The tournament was scheduled to take place from 15 December 2012 to 20 January 2013.

See also
 2012 World Series Hockey

References

2012-13
2012 in Indian sport
2012 in field hockey